Duzkend may refer to:
 Akhuryan, Armenia
 Alvar, Armenia
 Barodz, Armenia